Amy Agulay (born September 6, 1978) is a retired field hockey goalkeeper from Canada, who earned a total number of 24 international caps for the Canadian Women's National Team during her career.

International Senior Tournaments 
 2001 – Pan American Cup, Kingston, Jamaica (3rd)
 2001 – World Cup Qualifier, Amiens/Abbeville, France (10th)
 2002 – Commonwealth Games, Manchester, England (7th)

External links
 
 
 

1978 births
Living people
Canadian expatriate sportspeople in the Netherlands
Canadian expatriate sportspeople in the United States 
Canadian female field hockey players
Female field hockey goalkeepers
Field hockey players at the 2002 Commonwealth Games

University of New Hampshire alumni
Commonwealth Games competitors for Canada